Aeroflot Flight 3843  was a Soviet Union commercial flight that crashed on January 13, 1977, after a left engine fire near Almaty Airport. All 90 people on board perished in the crash.

Aircraft and crew 
The aircraft involved in the accident was a Tupolev Tu-104B, registered СССР-42369 to Aeroflot. The aircraft was delivered to Aeroflot on October 31, 1958. At the time of the accident, the aircraft had accumulated 27,189 flight hours and 12,819 landings in service.

The flight crew consisted of a captain, a first officer, two navigators and a flight engineer; three flight attendants were stationed in the cabin.

Accident sequence 
Flight 3843 was a service from Khabarovsk to Almaty via Novosibirsk. The aircraft departed for the second leg of its flight from Novosibirsk at 17:13 on January 13, 1977. The fuselage broke in two; the front part of the fuselage sank into the ground . The rear of the fuselage with the tail assembly was pushed back  and not burned in the fire. Forensic examinations showed that the passengers were exposed to carbon monoxide during the flight.

Investigation 
The accident board found the aircraft's left engine had been subjected to fire for 10–15 minutes. The fire increased upon slowing down to land due to a decrease in the air flow, damaging the controls. The aircraft stalled and crashed three kilometers short of the airport.

References 

Aviation accidents and incidents in 1977
3843
Aviation accidents and incidents in the Soviet Union
Accidents and incidents involving the Tupolev Tu-104
1977 in the Soviet Union
Vnukovo International Airport
Airliner accidents and incidents caused by engine failure
January 1977 events in Asia
Aviation accidents and incidents in Kazakhstan